Ouvrage Col du Caire Gros is a lesser work (petit ouvrage) of the Maginot Line's Alpine extension, the Alpine Line. Additional blocks were planned but not built.

Description
Block 1 (west entry): unarmed, protected by Block 2.
Block 2 (infantry): one machine gun embrasure, protects Block 1.
Block 3 (not completed): one observation cloche planned.
Block 4 (unbuilt): one machine gun embrasure and one twin heavy machine gun embrasure planned.

The ouvrage blocks access to the Col du Caire Gros from the north.

See also
 List of Alpine Line ouvrages

References

Bibliography 
Allcorn, William. The Maginot Line 1928-45. Oxford: Osprey Publishing, 2003. 
Kaufmann, J.E. and Kaufmann, H.W. Fortress France: The Maginot Line and French Defenses in World War II, Stackpole Books, 2006. 
Kaufmann, J.E., Kaufmann, H.W., Jancovič-Potočnik, A. and Lang, P. The Maginot Line: History and Guide, Pen and Sword, 2011. 
Mary, Jean-Yves; Hohnadel, Alain; Sicard, Jacques. Hommes et Ouvrages de la Ligne Maginot, Tome 1. Paris, Histoire & Collections, 2001.  
Mary, Jean-Yves; Hohnadel, Alain; Sicard, Jacques. Hommes et Ouvrages de la Ligne Maginot, Tome 4 - La fortification alpine. Paris, Histoire & Collections, 2009.  
Mary, Jean-Yves; Hohnadel, Alain; Sicard, Jacques. Hommes et Ouvrages de la Ligne Maginot, Tome 5. Paris, Histoire & Collections, 2009.

External links 
 Col du Caire Gros (petit ouvrage du) at fortiff.be 
 Infos, localisation et photos de l'ouvrage de Caire Gros sur  at www.wikimaginot.eu 

COLC
Maginot Line
Alpine Line